Nezouh is a 2022 British-Syrian-French drama film written and directed by Soudade Kaadan.

The film premiered in the Horizons Extra section of the 79th edition of the Venice Film Festival, winning the Audience Award.

Plot

Cast  
     Hala Zein as Zeina
     Kinda Alloush as Hala
     Samir al-Masri as Motaz
     Nizar Alani as Amer

References

External links
 

2022 drama films
British drama films
French drama films
Syrian drama films